Elena Rodriguez-Falcon    (born 1972) is President and Chief Executive Officer at the New Model Institute for Technology and Engineering having briefly served as its Provost and Chief Academic Officer. Until January 2018, Elena was Professor of Enterprise and Engineering Education at the University of Sheffield and is principal fellow at the Higher Education Academy and fellow of the Institution of Engineering and Technology.

Early life and education 

Rodriguez-Falcon was born in Monterrey, Nuevo Leon, Mexico, in 1972. She studied mechanical engineering at the Universidad Autónoma de Nuevo León in Mexico, graduating with a first class degree in 1994, followed by a master's degree in mechanical engineering and industrial relations at the same university. In 2000, Rodriguez-Falcon was awarded a master's degree in mechanical engineering and industrial management at Sheffield Hallam University in the UK, and in 2005, she trained in learning and teaching for higher education professionals at The University of Sheffield.

Career
Rodriguez-Falcon worked in industry in Mexico from 1993 as a design and logistics engineer and later as a project and quality manager. In 2002 she joined the University of Sheffield in the UK, where initially she designed and directed degree programmes in mechanical engineering with business and enterprise. She began her academic career teaching business planning to engineers in several of the Faculty of Engineering's departments; her students worked with clients to develop engineering solutions which could later become commercial products.  A number of items designed during this course were produced and marketed.  One example is the speaking glove which allows people who have suffered a stroke and can not speak to communicate.  She also studied cultural differences in workplace expectations among engineering students.

In 2011, Rodriguez-Falcon was appointed to the post of director of enterprise education at the University of Sheffield, and in 2012 she became a full professor. In 2014 was also appointed faculty director of communications and external relations in the Faculty of Engineering.

From 2011 to 2014, Rodriguez-Falcon held the role of director of women in engineering.  In this role she wrote and spoke about the need for more women to become engineers and how this could be accomplished.  For her work in this field she was presented with a Women into Science and Engineering award in 2014.

In January 2018, Rodriguez-Falcon left Sheffield to join the newly founded New Model Institute for Technology and Engineering in Hereford in the role of inaugural provost and chief academic officer, and holds a distinguished chair in engineering education. Later in 2018, Rodriguez-Falcon took up the roles of President and Chief Executive Officer.

Honours and awards 
Rodriguez-Falcon has been recognised by the Higher Education Academy as a Principal Fellow, by the Royal Academy of Engineering in 2007 and was named the most inspirational academic at The University of Sheffield. In 2015, she received a doctorate of engineering honoris causa by her alma mater, the Universidad Autónoma de Nuevo León in México. In 2019, she was selected as a Fellow of the Institution of Engineering and Technology and in 2020 Rodriguez-Falcon was named Woman of the Year in Technology by FDM Everywoman .

References

External links
Profile at the University of Sheffield
Profile at Inspiration& Co.

NMITE

Living people
1972 births
Mexican chemical engineers
Autonomous University of Nuevo León alumni
Academics of the University of Sheffield
Fellows of the Royal Academy of Engineering
Female Fellows of the Royal Academy of Engineering
People from Monterrey
Mexican expatriates in England
Mexican LGBT scientists
Principal Fellows of the Higher Education Academy